Hospitality Club (HC) was a hospitality exchange service (a gift economy network for finding homestays whereby hosts were not allowed to charge for lodging) accessible via a website.

History

The first hospitality exchange service based on internet technology was Hospex.org in 1992 from Poland, which was later folded to Hospitality Club. Hospitality Club was founded in July 2000 in Koblenz, by Veit Kühne.

In 2005, a disagreement between some members of Hospitality Club and its founder led to the foundation of BeWelcome. Many HC members, who became distinguished volunteers within Couchsurfing (so-called CS ambassadors), left HC towards CS because of its missing legal status and insufficient management transparency.

In February 2006, Kühne was working full-time on Hospitality Club. In the spring of 2006, the hitherto biggest HC-Party took place in Riga counting 430 participants from 36 countries. As of July 2006, the site had 155,000 members. This number grew by around 1,000 new members a week in 2006. 

In 2007, Google Trends search volume for hospitalityclub.org started to decline and was overtaken by the search volume for CouchSurfing. In 2007, HC's specified goals have been to facilitate "intercultural   understanding ... bringing people together ... travelers and locals".

In 2008, HC had more than 400,000 members from 200 countries. 

In 2012, HC made a partnership with AirBnB, inviting its members to join AirBnB.

In 2013, HC had more than a half of million members from 200 countries.

By 2017, only one third of members were still active.

Maintenance of the portal stalled in 2019, since early 2021 Hospitality Club was unusable, since April 2022 it is not possible to access the website.

Safety measures
Hospitality Club had a reputation system, whereby members left references for others. For added safety, members were encouraged to check each other's passports, although it rarely happened.

References

External links
 A podcast about hospitality club on German RTL

Hospitality exchange services
German social networking websites